EN1-SL01 is a first class national road on the island of Sal, Cape Verde. It runs from Espargos to Santa Maria. It is Sal's only dual carriageway. In Espargos it is connected with EN1-SL-02 to Palmeira and EN3-SL-02 to Pedra de Lume. In Santa Maria it is connected with EN3-SL-01 to Ponta do Sinó.

See also
Transport in Cape Verde
Roads in Cape Verde

References

Sal, Cape Verde
Road transport in Cape Verde
Espargos
Santa Maria, Cape Verde